Jackie O often refers to Jacqueline Onassis, who was the wife of the 35th President of the United States, John F. Kennedy. 

It may also refer to:

Jackie O (opera), a 1997 opera by Michael Daugherty and Wayne Koestenbaum
Jackie O (radio host) (born 1975), Jacqueline Ellen Marie Henderson, an Australian television presenter and radio personality
Jacki-O (born 1975), American rapper
Jackie-O Motherfucker, an American experimental rock group